Legislation on euthanasia in Mexico distinguishes between passive and active euthanasia. Since 7 January 2008 the law allows the terminally ill —or closest relatives, if unconscious— to refuse medication or further medical treatment that may extend life (known as passive euthanasia) in Mexico City, in the state of Aguascalientes (since 6 April 2009) and, since 1 September 2009, in the state of Michoacán.

While the exact procedure may vary, the regional laws dealing with living wills —usually called — generally require a notary public to witness the instructions left by the patient.

As for active euthanasia, the Party of the Democratic Revolution (PRD) and the Institutional Revolutionary Party (PRI) have introduced bills to decriminalize it in both the Senate (2007) and the Legislative Assembly of the Federal District (2009),  but have failed to change the Article 166 bis 21 of the General Health Law, which still defines euthanasia as mercy homicide. In addition, 18 out of 31 states have modified their constitution under pressure from the dominant Catholic Church to protect the right to life "from the moment of conception until natural death", effectively discarding any initiative contemplating active euthanasia within state borders.

Practice

Official statistics are scarce but bioethicist Horacio García Romero claims that up to 45% of the terminally-ill patients in the country demand some form of passive euthanasia. In October 2010 the secretary of health for Mexico City announced that, since the legalization of passive euthanasia, 497 patients have formalized the process, including at least 41 out-of-state residents and 2 citizens of the United States.

Public opinion and political lobbying

According to a Parametría poll conducted in February 2008, 59% of Mexicans think doctors should have the legal right to end the life of a person suffering from an incurable illness upon a request by the patient and his or her relatives, while 35% disagree.

Its main opponents, anti-abortion activists and Christian churches —particularly the dominant Roman Catholic Church— have strongly lobbied against active euthanasia and promote different bills protecting the right to life "from the moment of conception until natural death." However, regional bills supporting passive euthanasia have been endorsed by several Catholic clergymen, including the archbishops of León and Morelia.

Suicide tourism

A drug known as liquid pentobarbital is used by owners to euthanize pets. When given to humans, the drug can give them a painless death in under one hour. The pet shops across Mexico have such drugs. As a result, elderly tourists from across the globe seeking to terminate their own lives were reported to be flying out to Mexico.

See also
 Law of Mexico

References

Mexico
Law of Mexico
Death in Mexico